Nagojanahalli is a panchayat town in krishnagiri district in the Indian state of Tamil Nadu.Nagojanahalli called as Nagarasampatti.

Demographics
 India census, Nagojanahalli had a population of 9953. Males constitute 51% of the population and females 49%. Nagojanahalli has an average literacy rate of 60%, higher than the national average of 59.5%: male literacy is 70%, and female literacy is 49%. In Nagojanahalli, 12% of the population is under 6 years of age.

References

Cities and towns in Krishnagiri district